Yifei Mo is an associate professor in the Department of Materials Science and Engineering (MSE) at the University of Maryland.

Education 
He completed an MSc and Ph.D. in materials science at the University of Wisconsin, Madison in 2008 and 2010 respectively. He went on to become a postdoctoral research associate in the Materials Science and Engineering department at the Massachusetts Institute of Technology from 2010 until 2013.

Career 

In 2013, Yifei Mo joined the faculty of the Department of Materials Science and Engineering (MSE) at University of Maryland.  He has been promoted to Associate Professor with tenure in 2019. Yifei Mo is internationally renowned for his work in theoretical and computational modeling of advanced materials for energy storage and conversion. Since joining the University of Maryland, he has spearheaded a new research group in computational materials science. He made significant research contributions in computational techniques based on quantum mechanisms, and machine learning to understand, discover, and design advanced renewable energy materials including next generation Li-ion batteries.

Awards and honors 

 Scialog Fellow of Advanced Energy Storage, Research Corporation Foundation, 2017
 3M Non-Tenured Faculty Award, 3M, 2019
 Outstanding Young Scientist Award, Maryland Academy of Sciences, 2019
 Junior Faculty Outstanding Research Award, 2022
 Highly Cited Researchers by Clarivate, 2021 and 2022

References 

American materials scientists
University of Maryland, College Park faculty
University of Wisconsin–Madison College of Engineering alumni
Peking University alumni
Massachusetts Institute of Technology people
Year of birth missing (living people)
Living people